Jeffrey Joseph Gal (born April 6, 1993) is an American professional soccer player who plays as a goalkeeper for Major League Soccer club Chicago Fire.

References

1993 births
Living people
American soccer players
Association football goalkeepers
BK Forward players
Skövde AIK players
Degerfors IF players
Ettan Fotboll players
Chicago Fire FC players
Superettan players
Allsvenskan players
American expatriate soccer players
Expatriate footballers in Sweden
American expatriate sportspeople in Sweden
Soccer players from Illinois